Doris M. Neal (August 30, 1928 – July 7, 2012) was an infielder and outfielder who played in the All-American Girls Professional Baseball League. Listed at 5' 4", 128 lb., she batted and threw right handed.

Doris Neal was a light-hitting batter during her two seasons in the league.

Born and raised in Lincoln Park, Michigan, she was the daughter of Jacob and Agnes (née Carlisle) Neal. She spent most of her career at third base, but was also used as a replacement in the outfield and as a pinch-hitter.

Neal entered the league in 1948 with the Springfield Sallies, playing for them in 97 games as part of an infield that included Mildred Meacham at first base, Evelyn Wawryshyn at second, and June Schofield at shortstop. Neal posted a .153 average and stole 23 bases in 122 games, driving in 28 runs and scoring 27 times, while 11 of her 62 hits were for extrabases.

She opened 1949 with the Grand Rapids Chicks, appearing sparingly in 58 games as a replacement player.

In 1988, she was honored along with the rest of the All-American Girls Professional Baseball League during the opening of Women in Baseball, a permanent display based at the Baseball Hall of Fame and Museum in Cooperstown, New York.

Doris Neal was a long time resident of Sarasota, Florida, where she died at the age of 83.

Career statistics
Batting 

Fielding

Sources

All-American Girls Professional Baseball League players
Baseball players from Michigan
People from Lincoln Park, Michigan
Sportspeople from Sarasota, Florida
1928 births
2012 deaths
21st-century American women